Cayetano Saguier Carreras was a Paraguayan football forward who played for Paraguay in the 1930 FIFA World Cup. He also played for Club Sportivo Luqueño.

References

External links
FIFA profile

Paraguayan footballers
Paraguay international footballers
Association football forwards
Sportivo Luqueño players
1930 FIFA World Cup players
Year of birth missing
Year of death missing